Bryan Roe Maguire, 1st Baron of Enniskillen (1589–1633), was a Gaelic Irish nobleman from Magherastephana, County Fermanagh. He was the son of Connor Roe Maguire, nicknamed "the Queen's Maguire" or "the Traitor Maguire" for his support of Elizabeth I's campaign in the Nine Years' War. Bryan was knighted on 2 February 1626 and made "Lord Maguire, Baron of Enniskillen" by James I on 3 March 1627. The Annals of the Four Masters was compiled under his patronage. His sons Connor Maguire, 2nd Baron and Colonel Rory Maguire died as officers of Confederate Ireland.

References

1589 births
1633 deaths
People from County Fermanagh
Barons in the Peerage of Ireland
Peers of Ireland created by Charles I
Members of the Irish House of Lords